The primary crops produced in Azerbaijan are agricultural cash crops, grapes, cotton, tobacco, citrus fruits, and vegetables. The first three crops account for over half of all production, and the last two together account for an additional 30 percent. Livestock, dairy products, and wine and liquors are also important farm products.

History
In the early 1990s, Azerbaijan's agricultural sector required substantial restructuring if it was to realize its vast potential. Prices for agricultural products did not rise as fast as the cost of inputs; the Soviet-era collective farm system discouraged private initiative; equipment in general and the irrigation system, in particular, were outdated; modern technology had not been introduced widely; and administration of agricultural programs was ineffective.

Most of Azerbaijan's cultivated lands, which total over 1 million hectares, are irrigated by more than 40,000 kilometers of canals and pipelines. The varied climate allows for the cultivation of a wide variety of crops, ranging from peaches to almonds and from rice to cotton. In the early 1990s, agricultural production contributed about 30 to 40 percent of Azerbaijan's net material product, while directly employing about one-third of the labor force and providing a livelihood to about half the country's population. In the early postwar decades, Azerbaijan's major cash crops were cotton and tobacco, but in the 1970s grapes became the most productive crop. An anti-alcohol campaign by Moscow in the mid-1980s contributed to a sharp decline in grape production in the late 1980s. In 1991 grapes accounted for over 20 percent of agricultural production, followed closely by cotton.

Production of virtually all crops declined in the early 1990s. In 1990 work stoppages and anti-Soviet demonstrations contributed to declines in agricultural production. The conflict in Nagorno-Karabakh, the site of about one-third of Azerbaijan's croplands, substantially reduced agricultural production beginning in 1989. In 1992 agriculture's contribution to NMP declined by 22 percent. This drop was attributed mainly to cool weather, which reduced cotton and grape harvests, and to the continuation of the Nagorno-Karabakh conflict. The conflict-induced blockade of the Nakhichevan Autonomous Republic also disrupted agriculture there.

An estimated 1,200 state and cooperative farms are in operation in Azerbaijan, with little actual difference between the rights and privileges of state and cooperative holdings. Small private garden plots, constituting only a fraction of total cultivated land, contribute as much as 20 percent of agricultural production and more than half of livestock production. Private landholders do not have equal access, however, to the inputs, services, and financing that would maximize their output.

The Ministry of Agriculture of Azerbaijan runs procurement centers dispersed throughout the country for government purchase of most of the tobacco, cotton, tea, silk, and grapes that are produced. The Ministry of Grain and Bread Products runs similar operations that buy a major portion of grain production. The remaining crops are sold in the private sector.

The role of the Government 
The Azerbaijani government tries to play an active role in the development of agriculture. For this purpose, it applies various measures including import substitution, tax exemptions, subsidies of machinery (combines, tractors, harvesters, and irrigation equipment), pesticides, and fertilizers. Land improvement, support and development of rural infrastructure, development of villages, and improvement of agricultural management are considered to be part of government support in the agricultural sector. As a result of these promotions, the Azerbaijani government aims to increase productivity, technical and technological renewal, growth and diversification of agricultural exports, an efficient organization of state support, improvement of the mechanism for subsidizing, development of large farms, provision of support to small farms, etc.

According to the statistics of 2013, there were 871,220 rural farms and households, 2,343 agricultural enterprises, 2,593 farms of individual entrepreneurs, and 531 ventures that operate in the agricultural sector of Azerbaijan.

In 2012, the state allocated 468.2 million AZN (US$596.4 million) to the agricultural sector. In 2011, this number was 444.7 million AZN (around US$566.5 million). It was estimated that in 2012, $247 was spent from the state budget per hectare of land suitable for agricultural production, including both crops and livestock. Additionally, the volume of direct and indirect subsidies allocated by the government to the agriculture sector in 2012, was around 611 million AZN (more than US$778.3 million- 100 US Dollars = 78.5000 Azerbaijani Manats on 12/31/2012).

The overall funds allocated from the state budget to the agro-industrial complex was 878.9 million AZN in 2011–2012. 485.7 million AZN which was accounted for 55.3 percent of total funds spent on the agro-industrial complex from the state budget was due to loans provided under state guarantee and irrigation and water management. 13.7 percent of this fund was in the form of direct subsidies, 9 percent on soft loans, 6.3 percent on fertilizers, machinery, and breed animals, 4.4 percent on forestry, fishing, hunting, and environmental measures, and so on.

As a direct result of state intervention in the agricultural sector, in January 2013, agricultural production increased 4.5 percent in Azerbaijan to 187.5 million AZN (growth in vegetable and crop production by 4.9 percent and in livestock by 4.5 percent). The exports of agricultural products (fruit and vegetable) from Azerbaijan amounted to US$276.7 million in January–June 2018 and it was 27 percent more than in 2017.

For 2019, the farmers will be provided with loans worth 10 million AZN to through the State Service on Management of Agricultural Projects and Credits under Azerbaijan's Agriculture Ministry.

The Food Safety Agency of the Republic of Azerbaijan which is a central executive authority is an additional attempt of the Azerbaijani government in order to develop agriculture further. The Agency regulates food safety standards (preparation and adoption of sanitation norms and hygiene standards), implement risk assessment, formal registration of agricultural products, and the materials that used for packaging. Moreover, it issues food safety certificates to exported food products, carries out state control over food safety, and protects the rights of consumers of agricultural products at all stages of the food supply chain.

On August 19, 2019, President Ilham Aliyev has signed a decree on the application of the Law of the Republic No. 1617-VQ dated June 27, 2019 "On Agricultural Insurance"  and the establishment of the Agrarian Insurance Fund.

State programs on the development of agriculture 
The following state programs have been designed by the government of Azerbaijan in order to be implemented under the control of the Ministry of Agriculture of the Republic of Azerbaijan;

 The State Program for the Intensive Development of Livestock and the Effective Use of Pasture Areas;
 The State Program for the Development of Grain-Growing;
 The State Program for the Development of Seed Growing;
 The State Program on Citrus Fruit Development in the Republic of Azerbaijan for 2018–2025;
 The State Program for Development of Tea-growing in the Republic of Azerbaijan for2018-2027;
 The State Program for Development of Rice Growing in 2018–2025;
 The State program for the Development of Azerbaijan Silkworm Breeding and Sericulture in the Republic of Azerbaijan for 2018–2025;
 The State Program on the development of cotton growing in the Republic of Azerbaijan for 2017–2022;
 The State Program on Development of Agricultural Cooperation in the Republic of Azerbaijan for 2017–2022;
 The Strategic Road Map for the Production and Processing of Agricultural Products in the Republic of Azerbaijan;
 The State Program on socio-economic development of regions of the Republic of Azerbaijan for 2014–2018;
 The State Programme on reliable food supply of population in the Azerbaijan Republic (2008-2015);
 The State Program on the development of viticulture in the Republic of Azerbaijan in 2012–2020;

Labor practices
In a 2013 U.S. Department of Labor report on Azerbaijan's labor conditions, research showed that children "are engaged in child labor in agriculture and street work." In fact, evidence of child labor has been observed in the agricultural sector as far as the production of cotton, tea and tobacco is concerned.
In 2014, the Bureau of International Labor Affairs issued a List of Goods Produced by Child Labor or Forced Labor and Azerbaijan was listed among the countries resorting to child labor when it comes to cotton production.

Production statistics of agriculture industry for 2015-2016 
Azerbaijan produced in 2018:

 2.0 million tons of wheat;
 916 thousand tons of barley;
 898 thousand tons of potato;
 609 thousand tons of tomato;
 307 thousand tons of watermelon;
 277 thousand tons of sugar beet;
 277 thousand tons of apple;
 247 thousand tons of maize;
 235 thousand tons of onion;
 233 thousand tons of cotton;
 223 thousand tons of cucumber;
 167 thousand tons of grape;
 160 thousand tons of persimmon (5th largest world producer);
 108 thousand tons of cabbage;

In addition to smaller productions of other agricultural products, like melon (94 thousand tons), pear (52 thousand tons) and apricot (28 thousand tons).

The overall agricultural product value with general prices was estimated to be 3290.4 million manat in January–July 2016. The production of January–July in the agricultural industry was 51% and 49% and related to cattle-breeding industry and plant-growing industry respectively.

The production from cattle-breeding and plant-growing industries were increased in respect to the same period of the previous year. However, the overall production from the agricultural industry decreased by 6.3% in relation to the previous year.

In 2016, the majority of products of the agricultural industry was increased in production capacity in comparison to the previous year, but the capacity of vegetables and vegetable garden production was decreased.

1628,9 thousand hectares or 2.7% more in relation to the previous year planting was taken place on 1 August.

Cultivated area for spring plants, 1000 ha:

Production in 2018:

Cultivated area, 2018:

Market of agricultural products 
The agricultural products with the value of 204,7 million USA dollars was exported between January and July 2016. The export of agricultural products was increased by 29,7% in comparison with previous year.

The export of agriculture:

The wholesale value of products such as bean (Shamkir), carrots (Barda), garlic (Aghsu), potato (Shamkir), apple (Jalilabad) and strawberry (Jalilabad) was increased in current year, however the value of other products in this industry was either decreased or remained the same.

The change of wholesale price of agricultural products in July in relation to the previous month price (in manats):

The wholesale value of products such as cucumber (Shamkir), garlic (Aghsu), apple, pear (dushes), cornelian cherry (Ganja), sloe, strawberry, cherryplums, peach (local) and apricot (local) was increased in current year, however the value of other products in this industry was either decreased or remained the same.

The change of wholesale price of agricultural products in July 2016 in relation to the previous year price (in manats):

Governmental support to agricultural industry 
"Aqrolizinq" OJSC in 2016 provided 1097 agricultural machineries with discounted leasing opportunities to 605 legal entities and individuals.

The agricultural machineries provided for leasing (quantity)

According to the requests of agricultural producers, 3255 breeding animals were bought and brought to the country and distributed between producers.

The imported and provided to leasing breeding animals (head)

In January–July 2016, the amount of 6073,4 thousand manats as credit was given to 77 different agricultural producers working at 25 different regions under the belated department of the Ministry of Agriculture. The credits were given 78,7% to the cattle-breeding industry, 2,5% to the plant-growing industry, and 4,6% to the fishing industry. In addition, the amount of 8049 manats was credited to 22 different entrepreneurs by Governmental line together with international parties.

Summary food balance of Azerbaijan in 2016, by crop products, ton

Nutrition safety

Plant-derived products projects 
In the period January–July 2016, the exported 628 agrochemical substance samples with 2512 quality indicators and 34 pesticide samples with 136 quality indicators, the imported and exported agricultural products of 2270 pesticide samples, 1271 samples of Nitrate and Nitrite residues, observed mycotoxin in the 286th sample and concentration of heavy metals in the 2657th sample were determined in Republic Toxicology and Quality Control Center laboratory of Governmental Fito-sanitary Control. 28588 appraisals by experts were held based on the 13098th sample of imported and exported plants and plant-growing products and 1624 protocols of appraisals by experts were created in Republic Quarantine Expertise Center's laboratory. The 791239 m3 wooden material, objects, and empty containers of 13863 tonnes technical load was neutralized by the Republic Quarantine Expertise Center fumigation department. According to Republic Quarantine Expertise Center's laboratory, the agricultural product samples analyzing let 1 held quarantine and 17 harmful organisms neutralization. 9.2 tonnes of nectarine was destroyed

due to being in quarantine for observed harmful organisms. In 2016, 23.3 tonnes of fruit and vegetable products were removed from the sales and destroyed due to not being within the limits of standards provided by the Republic Quarantine Expertise Center.

Animals based products projects 
In July 2016, in order to improve the quality of controlling the animals based products safety, a general check-up was held, and consequently, 3573 kg of meat (cow, sheep, ham and birds), 5038 kg of internal organs of small and big-horned animals, 404 kg of fish, 1489 kg of milk and milk-based products and 3935 eggs were destroyed according to internal rules due to not being within the standards. Besides that, during the checkup regarding the safety of animals based products in July, 150 kg of unknown horse meat was identified and destroyed.

See also 
 Agrarian reforms in Azerbaijan
 Silk industry in Azerbaijan

Notes

External links

 Evaluation and Modeling of Comparative Advantages in Agriculture in Azerbaijan
 Country Studies - Azerbaijan
 Azerbaijan: Expects 6-7%-growth in agriculture sphere
 Azerbaijan: Agriculture products will be doubled by 2020